Ole Lennart Fyrand (4 April 1937 – 30 December 2017) was a Norwegian physician.

He was born in Drammen. A professor of medicine at the University of Oslo from 1978, he was a recognized specialist in dermatology and venereology from the year before.

References

1937 births
2017 deaths
People from Drammen
Norwegian dermatologists
Academic staff of the University of Oslo